Jamil Kasirye (born 1954) is a retired football goalkeeper who played for Uganda in the 1978 African Cup of Nations.

Career
Born in Kasubi (a suburb of Kampala), Kasirye played club football for Lint FC, Kampala City Council FC, SC Villa and Bank of Uganda FC. He won two Ugandan Premier League titles with Villa, won the Ugandan Cup three times (twice with KCC and once with Villa), and captained the Villa side that reached the quarter-finals of the 1983 African Cup of Champions Clubs.

Kasirye made several appearances for the Uganda youth and senior national teams. His last match was a 0–3 defeat by Zambia in July 1984.

References

External links
11v11 Profile

1954 births
Living people
Ugandan footballers
Uganda international footballers
1978 African Cup of Nations players
SC Villa players
Kampala Capital City Authority FC players
Association football goalkeepers
Sportspeople from Kampala